The 1871 St. Louis tornado was an F3 tornado that touched down in St. Louis, Missouri on Wednesday, March 8, 1871, at 3:00pm. The tornado was on the ground for 3 minutes. A total of 30 homes were destroyed and 30 severely damaged. Six railroad depots were destroyed with eight deaths in them. One death occurred on a bridge. Overall, 9 people were killed, 60 injured, and $1,500,000 damage occurred. It is one of four tornadoes (1896, 1927, 1959) that have ripped through the central business district of St. Louis.

See also 
 List of North American tornadoes and tornado outbreaks
 St. Louis tornado history

References 

1871 St. Louis tornado
St. Louis tornado
1871 St. Louis tornado
1871 St. Louis tornado
19th century in St. Louis
St. Louis tornado
March 1871 events